Bolshunov is a Russian masculine surname, its feminine counterpart is Bolshunova. It may refer to
Aleksandr Bolshunov (born 1996), Russian cross-country skier 
Daniil Bolshunov (born 1997), Russian football player

Russian-language surnames